Henry Ernest Boote (1865 – 1949) was an Australian editor, journalist, propagandist, poet, and fiction writer.
Wrote ‘A Fool’s Talk’ (1915)

Biography
Born in Liverpool, England, 20 May 1865, Boote began working as an apprentice to a printer at the age of ten before emigrating to Australia in 1889. That same year he married Mary Jane Paingdestre, and began working in Brisbane as a compositor. He was an inspired trade unionist and became involved in the Queensland labour movement, writing articles and propagandist from a socialist slant.  In 1894, the Australian Labour Federation posted Boote to Bundaberg as editor of the Bundaberg Guardian.  In 1896 he moved to Gympie, where he established a paper called The Gympie Truth, and in 1902 became editor of The Worker in Brisbane.  He was also the founding editor of The Queensland Worker (1902–11), and The Australian Worker (1914–43)  Boote was a friend and associate of Prime Ministers Andrew Fisher, James Scullin, and John Curtin.
Boote died in Rose Bay, New South Wales on 14 August 1949.

Works

Prose

Set the Twelve Men Free, Sydney: New South Wales Labor Council, 1918
The land of Wherisit: a cycle of tales that begins at the end and ends at the beginning; told by a graduate of All Fools' College for the entertainment of his kind, Sydney : The Judd Publishing Co., 1919
The case of Grant: fifteen years for fifteen words, Sydney: Social Democratic League, (date?)
The Human Ladder: an Australian story of our own time, Sydney: Judd Publishing, 1920
Tea with the Devil and Other Diversions, 1928

Poetry

As I Went By: Poems, Sydney: Worker Trustees, 1933
The siren city, Sydney, 1935
I look forth, Sydney: Worker Trustees, 1937
May Day: a commemoration poem written for the great May day demonstration in Sydney, 1938

Notes

Australian trade unionists
Australian editors
Australian journalists
Australian poets
People from Gympie
1865 births
1949 deaths
20th-century Australian writers